Scott Keswick is a retired American gymnast who competed in the 1992 Olympic Games.

Childhood and junior career

Keswick was born on 3 March 1970 in Washington, DC. The son of an Air Force sergeant, Keswick moved around as a child. He considers Las Vegas his home town.

Keswick first became interested in gymnastics when he was seven-years old and living in Iran while his father was stationed there. He was instructed on trampoline by local coaches (few Iranians were gymnasts). They noticed his talent and suggested he train for the sport when he returned to the United States.

Keswick participated in the 1985 Junior Olympics and earned a bronze in the all-around, along with a gold on parallel bars and a silver on vault.  At the 1987 Junior Olympics he moved up to win gold in the all-around, along with golds on still rings, vault, and parallel bars, as well as a bronze on floor.

College career

Keswick competed for UCLA from 1988 to 1992, earning eight all-Americans.  He overlapped with teammate Chris Waller, who was also in the 1992 Olympics, for his first two years. As a freshman, Keswick  In 1992, Keswick won the Nissen Award, men's gymnastics's "Heisman".

References

External links

Interviews and commentary
interview, 1993 Winter Cup
interview, 1994 Hilton Challenge
Fluff (human interest piece) from the 1996 National Championships, discussing his back injury
Fluff (human interest piece) from the 1996 Olympic Trials, discussing 1992 Olympic disappointment

Routines
Floor (1992 U.S. Championships, 9.70)
Pommel horse (1992 U.S. Championships, 9.70)
Still rings (1992 American Cup, "perfect 10.00")
Vault (1993 Winter Cup, 9.45)
Parallel bars (1992 American Cup, 9.70)
High bar (1994 Hilton Challenge, 9.60)

UCLA Bruins men's gymnasts
Olympic gymnasts of the United States
Gymnasts at the 1992 Summer Olympics
Living people
1970 births
Sportspeople from Washington, D.C.
American male artistic gymnasts